This is a list of glass factories with ties to the J. H. Hobbs, Brockunier and Company glass works in Wheeling, West Virginia.  This company was one of the leading glass manufacturers in the United States during the 19th Century.  Former employees of the Hobbs works were essential employees, founders, or top management for over 20 glass factories in West Virginia, Ohio, Pennsylvania, and Indiana.  Wheeling's Hobbs glass works was renamed multiple times during its existence of approximately 60 years.  Listed below are names used by the Hobbs glass works.

Barnes & Hobbs
Hobbs, Barnes & Company
Barnes, Hobbs & Company
Hobbs & Barnes
J. H. Hobbs, Brockunier & Company
Hobbs, Brockunier & Company
Hobbs Glass Company
Factory H of United States Glass Company

Glass factories
Glass factories tied to former employees of the Hobbs and Brockunier glass works are listed below in the sortable list.  The first five categories in the list can be sorted. The list's default sort orders the properties alphabetically by name.  Notes are listed in the last section.

Notes

References

Glassmaking companies of the United States